Mister Pellam is a 1993 Telugu-language comedy film produced by Gawara Partha Sarathi under the Sri Chamundi Chitra banner and directed by Bapu. It stars Rajendra Prasad, Aamani  and music composed by M. M. Keeravani. This film is inspired by Mr. Mom and was recorded as a Hit at the box office. The film won the National Film Award for Best Feature Film in Telugu. The film won six Nandi Awards.

Plot
Balaji is a bank employee married to housewife Jhansi, with 2 lovely kids. He gets promoted to head cashier and as per the rules, gets one key for the bank vault with the other key present with the bank manager. He celebrates it by buying a television set (the first in the colony!) but due to the treacherous and cunning plan by Bharani along with another bank employee as his aid, Balaji is found accountable to a 1 lakh loss to the bank. He gets suspended from the bank on the day of the promotion itself but to his surprise, he doesn't get recruited into any other job from the next day as he has a negative record. Jhansi convinces Balaji that she'd use her B.Com. qualification to get work in Annapurna Foods company, whose managing director is her friend from the 12th grade. She goes to meet Gopal Krishna, her friend in the office. After using her wit/charm/brains in tackling a business issue in the board meeting at which she is coincidentally present, Jhansi gets the job as vice president for a Sales division, with a pay of 10 thousand a month. She tells her husband that she secured a job with 3 thousand monthly pay.

Meanwhile, Balaji challenges Jhansi that he can take care of the house as he considers it a very easy job and he struggles at home. He cannot make his kids get ready for school, cannot cook at home and cannot manage even simple chores. He hates Jhansi working in the office while he sits at home, but his hands are tied. A few fights ensure between the couple over the same issues and finally, after Krishnashtami celebration events at Gopal's house, Balaji loses his rag. He accuses Jhansi that she wanted her husband to feel bad about himself which is why she took him to Gopal's house to show him how wealthy and happy Gopal is. Jhansi gets a 20 grand bonus in office for a massive increase in sales and her savings amount to 85 grand. She borrows 15K from Gopal and gives 1 lakh to Balaji asking him to submit it in the bank, which makes Balaji angry. He cannot believe that even his wife would think that her husband had stolen the money and leaves the house. He calls Bharani from a payphone and tells him that he cracked the vile plan of theirs. Meanwhile, Jhansi takes the help of her friend Gopal and calls the bank chairman to tell him about the false case. Everything falls in line at the end and the couple patch up their differences.

Cast
 Rajendra Prasad as Balaji / Lord Vishnu
 Aamani as Jhansi /  Lakshmi Goddess
 A.V.S as Gopala Krishna 
 Tanikella Bharani as Bank Manager 
 Gundu Sudarshan as Narasaya / Narada
 Dharmavarapu Subrahmanyam
 Jenny
 Master Uday
 Baby Anuradha

Soundtrack

Music composed by M. M. Keeravani. Music released on AKASH Audio Company.

Awards
National Film Awards
Best Feature Film in Telugu

Nandi Awards - 1993
Best Feature Film - Gold - G. Parthasaradhy
 Best Actress - Aamani
 Best Male Playback Singer - S.P.Balasubramanyam
 Second Best Story Writer - Mullapudi Venkata Ramana
 Best Makeup Artist - Nageswara Rao
 Special Jury Award - A.V.S

References

External links

1993 films
Indian comedy films
Films scored by M. M. Keeravani
Indian feminist films
Films about social issues in India
Films about women in India
Social realism in film
Films shot in Hyderabad, India
Films about sexual abuse
Films with screenplays by Mullapudi Venkata Ramana
Films directed by Bapu
1990s Telugu-language films
Best Telugu Feature Film National Film Award winners
1993 comedy films
1990s feminist films